The 1979 British Columbia general election was the 32nd general election in the Province of British Columbia, Canada. It was held to elect members of the Legislative Assembly of British Columbia. The election was called on April 3, 1979.  The election was held on May 10, 1979, and the new legislature met for the first time on June 6, 1979.

The governing Social Credit Party of British Columbia of Bill Bennett was re-elected with a majority government, and won almost half of the popular vote. The electorate was polarized between the Socreds and the social democratic New Democratic Party of former premier Dave Barrett, which won just under 46% of the popular vote and all of the remaining seats in the legislature. The NDP made up much of the ground it had lost in its severe defeat of four years earlier. However, the Socreds dominated the Fraser Valley and the Interior, allowing Bennett to cling to government by three seats.

Of the other parties only the Progressive Conservatives won over 1% of the popular vote, but their 5% of the vote did not enable them to hold on to their single seat in the legislature. Party leader Victor Stephens complained during the campaign that the federal PC Party was providing no assistance to the provincial party, favouring Social Credit instead. The caused embarrassment for federal party leader Joe Clark, who was leading his own election campaign for the May 22, 1979 federal election.

Results

Note:

* Party did not nominate candidates in the previous election.

See also
List of British Columbia political parties

References

Further reading
 

1979
1979 elections in Canada
1979 in British Columbia
May 1979 events in Canada